The 2023 UCI ProSeries is the fourth season of the UCI ProSeries, the second tier road cycling tour, below the UCI World Tour, but above the various regional UCI Continental Circuits.

The calendar consists of 57 events, of which 33 are one-day races (1.Pro), and 24 are stage races (2.Pro). There are 49 events in Europe, six in Asia, one in the United States, and one in Argentina.

Events

References

 
2023
UCI ProSeries
ProSeries